Kevin Yann (born 11 September 1989 in Quimper, France) is a French footballer who last played for Darwin Olympic in Australia in 2017.

Career

Singapore

Assisted by his agent who contacted him with Etoile FC, the first French expatriate football club in Singapore, Yann was subject to a physical test upon arriving in the country, making the team and earning a salary ranging from 1000 to 3000 euros. There, he lifted the 2010 S.League and Singapore League Cup trophies with Etoile, seeking a move to Thailand after the end of the season.

Indonesia

Going to Indonesia in 2011, Yann stated that he enjoyed the obstreperousness of the fans there, also claiming that the level was much higher than in Singapore and that he was satisfied with his decision to go there with the club providing him housing as well. Despite saying that he wanted a move to a Chinese for Japanese team later on, the French midfielder instead completed a transfer with another Indonesian side, PPSM Sakti Magelang, in 2012. However, PPSM Sakti Magelang soon went into insolvency and Yann was forced to go back to France by summer 2013, deciding to play for amateur outfit AS Plouhinec.

Almost signed for Persijap Jepara in 2013 but the deal never happened.

References

External links 
 French Wikipedia Page
 at Footballdatabase.eu

FC Lorient players
French expatriate sportspeople in Singapore
French expatriate footballers
French footballers
Expatriate footballers in Indonesia
Expatriate footballers in Singapore
Association football midfielders
Sportspeople from Quimper
Singapore Premier League players
En Avant Guingamp players
Expatriate soccer players in Australia
French expatriate sportspeople in Australia
1989 births
Living people
Footballers from Brittany
Étoile FC players